Visiana brujata, the brujata carpet, is a moth of the family Geometridae first described by Achille Guenée in 1857. It is found in the Australian Capital Territory, New South Wales and Tasmania.

The wingspan is about 30 mm.

External links
Australian Faunal Directory

Moths of Australia
Xanthorhoini
Moths described in 1857